Truth of Truths - a Contemporary Rock Opera is a 1971 two-disc Christian rock album, which was largely conceived by promoter/producer Ray Ruff. The album is arranged as a rock opera based on significant events in the Christian Bible, with the first two sides pertaining to the Old Testament and two to the New Testament. The album has a black cover with a white title and a gold Star of David and Cross. It comes with a 17-page booklet with lyrics and biblical references for each of the songs.

The double LP was substantially co-written with former Them bassist Alan Henderson, and with Val Stöecklein, formerly of The Blue Things (whose most famous song "Orange Rooftops Of Your Mind" is re-recorded here with new lyrics as "John the Baptist"). Both bands had been managed by Ray Ruff. Donnie Brooks plays Christ. Actor Jim Backus plays the spoken voice of God.

Track listing
 "The Overture" (Ernie Freeman/Ray Ruff) – 4:29
 "Creation", Genesis 1 & 2 (Alan Henderson & Dick Hieronymus) – 3:06
 "The Fall", Genesis 3 (Alan Henderson & Dick Hieronymus) – 4:52
 "Forty Days and Forty Nights", Genesis 6-8 (Don Great) – 4:13
 "Tower of Babel", Genesis 11 (Don Great) – 2:12
 "God Called on to Abraham", Genesis 12 & 17 (Don Great) - 3:04
 "Sodom and Gomorrah Were the Cities of Sin", Genesis 19 (Don Great) – 3:13
 "Joseph, Beloved Son of Israel", Genesis 37-45 (Alan Henderson) – 3:10
 "Let My People Go", Exodus 1-15, 32 (Kay & Helen Lewis) – 4:05
 "The Ten Commandments", Exodus 20 (Val Stöecklein) – 2:45
 "Song of the Children of Israel (Exodus)", Exodus 15 (Val Stöecklein) – 2:42
 "David to Bathsheba", 2 Samuel 11 & 12 (Val Stöecklein)– 3:02
 "Turn Back to God", Jeremiah 2-5 (Kay & Helen Lewis) – 3:12
 "Prophecies of the Coming Messiah", Isaiah 7:14; 9:6,7; 53:3-7; Micah 5:2; Jeremiah 31:15; Deuteronomy 16:10; 27:12; 41:9; 68:18 (Alan Henderson) – 3:23
 "My Life is in Your Hands", Luke 46-58 (Ray Ruff & Alan Henderson) – 2:50
 "John the Baptist", John 19-37 (Ray Ruff & Alan Henderson) – 2:34
 "He's the Light of the World", Matthew 5,6; 3 John (Kay & Helen Lewis) – 3:53
 "Hosanna", Matthew 21 (Ray Ruff & Alan Henderson) – 2:20
 "The Last Supper", Matthew 26:1-35; 1 John 13 (Val Stöecklein) – 4:45
 "I am What I Say I am", Matthew 26:36-56 (Don Great) – 2:20
 "The Trial", Matthew 26:57 - 27:31 (Kay & Helen Lewis) – 5:12
 "The Road", Luke 23:26-33 (Kay & Helen Lewis) – 2:42
 "The Cross", Luke 23:34-49 (Kay & Helen Lewis) – 5:50
 "Jesus of Nazareth", John 20:19-29 (Ray Ruffin & Don Great) – 1:36
 "Resurrection", John 20:11-18 (Val Stöecklein) – 4:45
 "He Will Come Again", Matthew 24:29-31; Revelation 19:11-16 (Lord Schoonmaker & Roger Lanoue) – 2:50
 "The Prophecies of the Coming of the End of the World", John 20:11-18 (Ray Ruff & Alan Henderson) – 6:13
Ray Ruff is credited with writing God parts.

Personnel
 Ray Ruff: Producer
 Rev. Raymond Harrison: Research
 Ernie Freeman: Arrangement
 Dick Hieronymus: Arrangement
 Jim Backus: the voice of God
 Donnie Brooks: Lead Vocals
 Dick & Sandy St. John: Lead Vocals
 John and Mike Mancha: Lead Vocals
 Lise Miller: Lead Vocals
 Patti Sterling: Lead Vocals
 Dave Rene: Lead Vocals
 Ben Short: Lead Vocals
 Pat Liston of the Friends and Brothers: Lead Vocals
 Lloyd Schoonmaker: Lead Vocals
 Don Great: Lead Vocals
 Doug Gibbs: Lead Vocals
 Val Stöecklein: Lead Vocals
 Background Vocals: Sonny Craver, Scott Thompson, Roberta Watson, Patrice Holloway, Andrea Albin, Janie Mickens Lovett, Doris Thompson, Karen Bourne, Judi Brown, Joanne Willis, Karen Ditto, Jessie Richardson, John and Herb.
 Musicians: Bill Kurasch, Sid Sharp, Christine Walevska, Hal Blaine, John Guerin, Larry Carlton, Dennis Budimir, Reinie Press, Larry Muhoberac, Gary Coleman, Joe Osborn, John Raines, Art Zungolo, Ralff Schaeffer, Ray Kelly, Harry Hyams, Sam Boghossian, Paul Hubinon, Tony Terran, Ed Stanley, Julie Jacob, Bill Fritz, Sinclair Lott, George Price, Robert Enevoldsen, Lou McCreary, Dick Hyde, Joseph DiFiore, Henry Ferber, Tibor Zelig, Arthur Maebe, William Hinshaw, Jerry Cole, and Ray Pohlman.

Reissued on a special collectors edition digitally remastered double CD album in 2018 by Oak Records Inc. LLC, produced by Don J. Long.

References

Rock operas
Albums produced by Reed Arvin